Milutin Kukanjac (Serbian Cyrillic: Милутин Кукањац; 1 January 1935 – 16 January 2002) was a Yugoslav military officer who was a colonel general with the Yugoslav People's Army (JNA) at the beginning of the Bosnian War.

Career
Kukanjac was commander of the Siege of Sarajevo from March until July 1992. Kukanjac and the Yugoslav People's Army left Sarajevo at this time.

Kukanjac commanded JNA units on Dobrovoljačka Street in Sarajevo on 3 May 1992 as members of the Army of the Republic of Bosnia and Herzegovina (ARBiH) ambushed the column of JNA units, seizing many weapons, and killing up to 42 Yugoslav soldiers, although the exact number is unknown. JNA officers claim only six soldiers were killed.

He was also responsible for ordering a demolition of the Armijska Ratna Komanda D-0 nuclear bunker on 7 May 1992, but the plan was sabotaged.

He appeared in the BBC documentary series The Death of Yugoslavia.

References

1935 births
2002 deaths
People from Čajetina
Generals of the Yugoslav People's Army
Serbian generals